Jon Blair Hunter was a Democratic West Virginia state senator from the 14th district, which represents Barbour County, Preston County, Taylor County, Tucker County and parts of Grant County and Monongalia County. He served from 1996 until 2008.  As a legislator he has been a voice for environmental issues and has sponsored legislation to stop Mountain Top Removal mining in West Virginia.

He retired having not sought re-election in 2008.

References

External links
 http://blogs.wvgazette.com/coaltattoo/2009/09/09/manchin-appoints-hunter-to-wva-surface-mine-board/
 http://mywvhome.blogspot.com/2007_11_11_archive.html

People from Mineral County, West Virginia
Democratic Party West Virginia state senators
Living people
Year of birth missing (living people)
21st-century American politicians